Longmorn (St Earnain's Church) is a village in Moray, Scotland, famous for its malt whisky distilleries.

This village was once a small railway junction, and the beginning of the Birnie Distillery rail spur; the now disused Elgin to Craigellachie line then continued south to Aviemore and beyond.  Longmorn station and its platform still survive and are in good condition.  While the station house is lived in, the track is long gone.  There are currently moves to clear the track to create a cycle path that would link Elgin to the Speyside Way at Craigellachie and from there to Aviemore and the National Cycle Network.

Most of the village is taken up by the BenRiach distillery (reopened 2004), and the Longmorn distillery. Relatively few people are employed in them and the village is mainly a dormitory of Elgin.

References 

Villages in Moray